Melanopella is a genus of harvestmen in the family Sclerosomatidae from the Sunda Islands.

Species
 Melanopella feuerborni Roewer, 1931
 Melanopella insularis Roewer, 1931
 Melanopella marginata Roewer, 1955

References

Harvestmen
Harvestman genera